An All-American team is an honorary sports team composed of the best amateur players of a specific season for each position—who in turn are given the honorific "All-America" and typically referred to as "All-American athletes", or simply "All-Americans".  Although the honorees generally do not compete as a unit, the term is used in United States team sports to refer to players who are selected by members of the national media.  Walter Camp selected the first All-America team in the early days of American football in 1889.  In 1950, the American Baseball Coaches Association (ABCA) selected its first All-American baseball team.  It has since chosen All-American teams and a player of the year for each division (National Collegiate Athletic Association (NCAA) Division I, Division II, Division III, National Association of Intercollegiate Athletics, junior college and high school).  Collegiate Baseball selects All-American, Freshman All-American and High School All-American teams.  Baseball America selects pre-season and post-season All-American teams and College Player of the Year honorees.

Various organizations selected All-American lists of the best players for the 1992 NCAA Division I college baseball season. The ABCA, the magazine Baseball America, and Collegiate Baseball were the NCAA-sanctioned selectors.  This list only includes players selected to the post-season All-American first team for each selector.  However, many All-American selections choose second, third, etc. teams from the remaining eligible candidates.

Accomplishments
Brooks Kieschnick, Phil Nevin and Lloyd Peever were named player of the year by ABCA, BA and CB, respectively. Jason Varitek was honored by all three selectors with selections on the 1993 and 1994 teams and would be player of the year in 1994.  Darren Dreifort repeated as a 1993 selection.  Kieschnick was both a  1991 and 1993 selection and became repeat player of the year in 1993.  Kieschnich won the Dick Howser Trophy in 1992 & 1993 and Varitek won it in 1994. Nevin won the 1992 College World Series Most Outstanding Player  Dreifort won the 1993 Rotary Smith Award, and Varitek won the award in 1994. Nevin won the 1992 Golden Spikes Award, and he was succeeded by Dreifort and Varitek in 1993 and 1994, respectively.

The 1992 All-American class featured three Major League Baseball All-Stars, two Olympians, one Major League Baseball record holder and a two-time World Series champion.   Varitek remained active. A total of 9 players were selected by all three NCAA-sanctioned selectors: pitchers Jeff Alkire, Lloyd Peever, Patrick Ahearne, and Dreifort; catcher Varitek; second baseman Brian Eldridge; outfielders Chad McConnell, Jeffrey Hammonds, and Troy Penix.  Texas was the only school with multiple players selected: Calvin Murray and Kieschnick.

Hammonds led the National League in fielding with a 1.000 fielding percentage including 157 putouts and 5 assists during the 1999 Major League Baseball season. He was selected for the 2000 MLB All-Star Game.  Although Phil Nevin has led his league in errors or passed balls in four different seasons at three different positions, he was a  2001 MLB All-Star and accumulated over 200 career home runs and over 1,000 hits.  Both Chris Roberts and McConnell played baseball at the 1992 Summer Olympics.  Varitek is a three-time MLB All-Star (2003, 2005 & 2008), Gold Glove-winner, Silver Slugger-winner and two-time World Series champion (2004 & 2007). Varitek has called the pitches for a major league record four no-hitters.

Key

All-Americans
Below are the Division I players selected to the various NCAA-sanctioned lists. The default list order is arranged by the position numbers used by official baseball scorekeepers (i.e., etc.).

References
General

Inline citations

College Baseball All-America Teams
All-America